Shahid  Manzoor is an Indian Politician. He was a member of the 16th Legislative Assembly of Uttar Pradesh of India. He represented the Kithore constituency as a member of  the Samajwadi Party political party.

Early life and  education
Shahid Manzoor was born in Meerut district, Uttar Pradesh. He attended the Chaudhary Charan Singh University and attained Master of Arts degree.

His father the late Manzoor Ahmed was a 5 time MLA. His family has been involved in politics since the 1960s.

Political career
Shahid Manzoor was elected a MLA for three straight terms. He represented the Kithore constituency and he is associated with the Samajwadi Party political party.

Posts held

See also
Kithore
Sixteenth Legislative Assembly of Uttar Pradesh
Uttar Pradesh Legislative Assembly

References 

Samajwadi Party politicians
Uttar Pradesh MLAs 2002–2007
Uttar Pradesh MLAs 2007–2012
Uttar Pradesh MLAs 2012–2017
Chaudhary Charan Singh University alumni
People from Meerut district
Uttar Pradesh MLAs 2022–2027
1955 births
Living people